Skudrinje is a village in the municipality of Mavrovo and Rostuša, North Macedonia.

Demographics
Skudrinje has traditionally been inhabited by a Muslim Macedonian (Torbešišta) population.

The name of the village is recorded in the 1467 Turkish defter of the Vilayet of Reka, in the form Iskudrina, then in the possession of the following feudal lords: Petar B-r-n-a-k-sh, Duka (or Doka), B-r-n-a-k-sh, Ajard Filip, ,Gerg Bard, Gerg Bard (different individual), Dikon Popoviќ, pop Georg(i), Gon Doksha (Duksha), Petko Skure, Gin Skure and Gon B-r-n-a-k-sh, with a majority bearing Albanian and a minority having mixed Slavic-Albanian or Slavic names.

According to the 2002 census, the village had a total of 2119 inhabitants. Ethnic groups in the village include:

Turks 1629
Macedonians 468
Albanians 5
Others 17

References

Villages in Mavrovo and Rostuša Municipality
Macedonian Muslim villages